WMIS-FM (92.1 FM, "92.1 The River") is an American radio station licensed to serve the community of Blackduck, Minnesota. The station's broadcast license is held by Paskvan Media, Inc.

It broadcasts a Mainstream Rock music format to the Bemidji, Minnesota, area. Programming includes Bob and Sheri and other programming.

External links
WMIS official website

Adult hits radio stations in the United States
Radio stations in Minnesota
Radio stations established in 2007